Mount Biddle is a mountain in British Columbia, Canada.

Location

Mount Biddle is in the Park Ranges of the Rocky Mountains in British Columbia, Canada.
It is near to Lake McArthur.
The mountain is in the Lake O'Hara area of Yoho National Park.

History

The mountain was named by Samuel E.S. Allen in 1894 after his friend, the author and publisher Anthony Joseph Drexel Biddle (1874–1903).
Allen described it as "a gigantic peak, or, more properly, a 'peaked' wall, which bids fair to occupy a prominent place as regards altitude among the other mountains of the region, and when regarded from a climber's point of view is impassible from the N. side, unless it be possible to climb a wall."
Curtis Peak, on the south shoulder of Mount Biddle, was named for the mathematics teacher Rest Fenno Curtis (1850–1918).
The first ascent was in 1903 by August S. Eggers, Herschel C. Parker, guided by  Christian Kaufmann and his brother Hans Kaufmann.

Notes

Sources

Three-thousanders of British Columbia
Canadian Rockies
Kootenay Land District